Andrew Keith Leigh (born 3 August 1972) is an Australian politician, author, lawyer and former professor of economics at the Australian National University. He currently serves as the Assistant Minister for Competition, Charities and Treasury. He briefly served as the Parliamentary Secretary to Prime Minister Julia Gillard in 2013 and then served as Shadow Assistant Treasurer from 2013 to 2019. He has been a Labor member of the Australian House of Representatives since 2010 representing the seat of Fraser until 2016 and Fenner thereafter.  Leigh is not a member of any factions of the Labor Party.

Early life and education
Both Leigh's parents are academics and both came from homes of social activists "in the Christian socialist tradition." His father's father, was a Methodist minister who seemed to have some sympathies for communism. "Keith thought they were wrong on God but had their hearts in the right place." Leigh's maternal grandfather, a boilermaker and Methodist lay preacher, used the family's spare room to shelter a constant stream of refugees from places like Cambodia and Chile, who were escaping the regimes of Pol Pot and Augusto Pinochet. 

Leigh's early years of education were in Sydney, Melbourne, Malaysia and Indonesia before completing secondary education at James Ruse Agricultural High School in Sydney, New South Wales. He graduated from the University of Sydney with a Bachelor of Arts with First Class Honours in 1994, and a Bachelor of Laws with First Class Honours in 1996. He then obtained a Master of Public Administration degree and a PhD in Public Policy from Harvard Kennedy School, where his thesis was "Essays in poverty and inequality". At Harvard, Leigh was a Doctoral Fellow at the Malcolm Wiener Centre for Social Policy from 2002 to 2004, and a Frank Knox Fellow from 2000 to 2004.

Leigh is one of at least ten MPs in the 47th Parliament of Australia who possesses a PhD, the others including Anne Aly, Jim Chalmers, Andrew Charlton, Daniel Mulino, Jess Walsh, Adam Bandt, Mehreen Faruqi, Anne Webster and Helen Haines.

Professional career
Before entering politics, Leigh worked as a lawyer for Minter Ellison in Sydney and Clifford Chance in London from 1995 to 1997. He was then associate to Justice Michael Kirby of the High Court of Australia from 1997 to 1998, senior trade adviser to Shadow Minister for Trade Senator Peter Cook from 1998 to 2000, and research fellow with the Progressive Policy Institute in Washington, D.C. in 2001. Leigh also served as a principal adviser to the Australian Treasury from 2008 to 2009.

Academic career 
Leigh was Professor of Economics at the Australian National University from 2004 to 2010. He also had several visiting appointments at the University of Melbourne, New York University, the Research Institute of Industrial Economics and the University of Michigan. Over his academic career, Leigh has published over 100 journal articles in the disciplines of economics, public policy and law and over 200 opinion pieces. Since entering parliament in 2010, he has authored or co-authored ten books.

Political career
In the 1995 NSW election, Leigh stood as the Labor candidate for the New South Wales state seat of Northcott, receiving an 8-point swing, but nonetheless losing by a large margin to Barry O'Farrell.

On 24 April 2010, Leigh was selected as Labor's candidate for the Australian federal seat of Fraser following the announced retirement of Bob McMullan. Fraser was a safe Labor seat. Leigh was subsequently elected in the Australian federal election held on 21 August 2010.

Gillard Government Ministry 
In 2013, Leigh served as the Government Spokesperson on Opposition costings. Leigh was then promoted into the Ministry of Julia Gillard on the 25 March 2013 as the Parliamentary Secretary to the Prime Minister following a Cabinet reshuffle in the wake of a failed leadership challenge on Prime Minister Julia Gillard. Leigh, a supporter of Gillard, lost this position after the June 2013 Labor leadership spill.

Shorten and Albanese Shadow Ministry 
After the 2013 federal election, Leigh was appointed by Bill Shorten as Shadow Assistant Treasurer and Shadow Minister for Competition. After the 2016 federal election, Leigh continued as the Shadow Assistant Treasurer and added the portfolios of Shadow Minister for Competition and Productivity, Shadow Minister for Charities and Not-for-Profits, and Shadow Minister for Trade in Services.

After the 2019 federal election, Leigh was dropped from the outer ministry of the Shadow Ministry of Anthony Albanese due to his decision to remain factionally unaligned. Leigh however was appointed to the parliamentary secretary-level positions of Shadow Assistant Minister for Treasury and Shadow Assistant Minister for Charities.

Albanese Government Ministry 
After the 2022 federal election, Leigh was appointed the Assistant Minister for Competition, Charities and Treasury. In this role, he has criticised the lack of dynamism in the Australian economy, and the decline in social capital in the Australian community.

Political views 
Leigh identifies as a social democrat, but within the Australian Labor Party he is aligned to no faction He has argued that Labor MPs should have more autonomy to dissent from caucus decisions. In a 2002 book he co-edited with the political scientist David Burchell, The Prince's New Clothes: Why Do Australians Dislike Their Politicians? Leigh suggested a more aggressive media, which covers politics like sport and gossip, and a general breakdown in "interpersonal" trust were largely responsible for politicians' falling stocks.

In making his first speech, he identified the American liberal Senator, Daniel Patrick Moynihan, as his role model. In the central part of his speech, he spoke about the Australian Project:"This Australian project is not finished. It’s not something that stopped with the end of the First World War or with the death of Ben Chifley....To me, the Australian project is about encouraging economic growth, while ensuring that its benefits are shared across the community. It is about making sure that all Australians have great public services, regardless of ethnicity, income or postcode. And it is about recognising that governments have a role in expanding opportunities, because no child gets to choose the circumstances of their birth."

Economic growth 
Leigh believes the "passion for raising living standards" is part of the Australian identity. He believes growth comes with free markets and innovation — and he strongly identifies with the liberalism of Australia's second Prime Minister, Alfred Deakin. In 2019, Leigh claimed the beliefs of the contemporary Australian Labor Party was that of social liberalism. Leigh credits Labor to being the inheritor of small-l liberalism in Australia, and that "social liberals have been cast out of the Liberal Party of Australia".In the digital age, that liberalism means a market that is free to develop technological innovation, even with its “creative destruction.” With his co-author Joshua Gans, Leigh has argued that the state must be wary of making entrepreneurs face prohibitively high costs, even as they face high chance of failure.

Community 
When Leigh went to Harvard for post-graduate research, he studied under the social scientist Robert Putnam, who had published the major work on declining social capital in America, Bowling Alone. Leigh has observed that Australians also 'bowl alone', as they are financially stretched, time poor, and unable to make regular commitments. Leigh is concerned that online communities have actually created more alienation for Australians, but this can be ameliorated when the state encourages volunteering and community groups

Opportunity 
Inequality is a key concern for Leigh, whose research has indicated that inequality is at a 75-year high within Australia. Though  Leigh  maintains that inequality is not automatically a bad thing in itself, it does concern him in practice because he believes that "rising inequality strains the social fabric." As a result, Leigh advocates some redistribution of wealth, in order to maintain opportunity for people. Leigh particularly wants to see university made more affordable than it is for most young people now.

Honours and awards
Leigh delivered the 2004 Garran Oration of the Institute of Public Administration Australia. In 2006 he was awarded the Best Discussant Award at the Annual PhD Conference in Economics and Business in 2006 and the Early Career Award by the Academy of the Social Sciences in Australia. Also in 2011 Leigh was appointed a Fellow of the Academy of the Social Sciences in Australia. In 2011, Leigh was awarded the Economic Society of Australia's Young Economist Award. This award, presented once every two years, is given to "honour that Australian economist under the age of forty who is deemed to have made a significant contribution to economic thought and knowledge." In 2022, Leigh was awarded the Accountability Round Table's John Button integrity award.

Personal life 
Leigh is married to Gweneth Leigh, and they have three sons: Sebastian, Theodore and Zachary. He is an endurance athlete, and has run all six World Marathon Majors (Berlin, Tokyo, Boston, London, Chicago and New York) in under three hours. His best marathon time is 2:42:48, in the 2017 Tokyo Marathon. He completed the Sri Chinmoy Canberra 100 kilometre trail race in 2022. In an article in Men’s Health, he described his favourite running routes in each Australian capital city.   

Leigh has undertaken several triathlons, including the 2021 Cairns Ironman, which he completed in a time of 10:48:11. He races as a supporter of the Indigenous Marathon Foundation. Leigh discusses the role of sport in his life in his book Fair Game: Lessons from Sport for a Fairer Society and a Stronger Economy.

Bibliography

Books

Critical studies and reviews of Leigh's work
Reconnected

References

External links

 
 Andrew Leigh – Archive of ANU academic work

1972 births
Academic staff of the Australian National University
Australian bloggers
Australian economists
Australian Labor Party members of the Parliament of Australia
Harvard Kennedy School alumni
Living people
Members of the Australian House of Representatives
Members of the Australian House of Representatives for Fenner
Members of the Australian House of Representatives for Fraser (ACT)
People educated at James Ruse Agricultural High School
Sydney Law School alumni
21st-century Australian politicians
Fellows of the Academy of the Social Sciences in Australia